Nuno Maulide, born in 1979 (Lisboa, Portugal), is a Portuguese chemist, currently professor of organic chemistry at the University of Vienna.

Biography 

After studies at the Instituto Superior Técnico in Lisbon and a master's degree in Molecular Chemistry at the Ecole Polytechnique in Paris, Nuno Maulide underwent doctoral studies in the University of Louvain (UCLouvain). 

In 2007, he obtained his PhD under the supervision of Prof. Istvan Marko, working on the application of functionalized orthoesters in organic synthesis. He then moved to Stanford University for a post-doctoral stay in the group of Prof. Barry Trost. Nuno Maulide started his independent career in 2009, when he was appointed group leader at the Max-Plank-Institut für Kohlenforschung in Mülheim an der Ruhr. 

In 2013 at the age of 33 he moved to the University of Vienna, taking a position as Full Professor of Organic Synthesis (as the successor to Johann Mulzer). In 2012, Nuno Maulide was awarded a European Research Council Starting grant. He currently holds a European Research Council Consolidator grant (awarded in 2015-16). Nuno Maulide is also a member of the Young Academy of the Austrian Academy of Sciences and since 2017 serves in the Board of the Austrian Science Fund. He is also the founding Chair of the Division of Organic Chemistry of the Austrian Chemical Society. He has been Associate Editor at the American Chemical Society journals Organic Letters and JACS Au since 2018. Nuno Maulide is also Adjunct PI at the CeMM since 2018 and runs a large collaboration with Boehringer Ingelheim, funded by the Christian Doppler Gesellschaft, since 2019.

Awards 

 Lhoist R&D Prize (2005)
 Best oral communication at the YoungChem (2005)
 Best oral communication at the Frühjahrssymposium (2006)
 Roche Award (2007)
 DSM Awards in Science & Technology (2007)
 Thieme Journal Award (2010)
 ERC Starting Grant (2011)
 ADUC Prize (2012)
 Bayer Early Excellence in Science Award (2012)
 Heinz Maier-Leibnitz Prize (2013)
 "Wiener Mut" Prize (2014)
 EurJOC Young Researcher Award (2015)
 ERC Consolidator Grant (2016)
 Elisabeth Lutz-Preis of the Austrian Academy of Sciences (2016)
 Elected to the Young Academy of the Austrian Academy of Sciences (2017)
 Incentive Award of the City of Vienna (2017)
 Marcial Moreno-Manas Lectureship (2017) 
 Springer Heterocyclic Chemistry Award (2018)

Other interests 

Nuno Maulide is also a pianist, and gave concerts on various occasions. Notably, he was finalist in the 2012 International Amateur Piano Competition held in Manchester. He was also finalist and fourth place at the International Piano Competition for Outstanding Amateurs in Paris 2013. He is also involved in the popularization of chemistry, especially for children.

References

1979 births
Maulide, Nuno
Portuguese chemists
Academic staff of the University of Vienna
Instituto Superior Técnico alumni
École Polytechnique alumni
Université catholique de Louvain alumni
European Research Council grantees